"Gypsy Woman" is a 1961 rhythm and blues song written by Curtis Mayfield and recorded by his group the Impressions. The group's first single following the departure of lead singer Jerry Butler, it reached No. 2 on the US Billboard R&B chart, No. 20 on the Billboard Hot 100 and number 17 on the Cash Box chart. It also appeared on the group's 1963 eponymous debut album. Brian Hyland (1970), Bobby Womack (1985), and Santana (1990) covered this song.

Brian Hyland cover

In 1970, Brian Hyland recorded his version of the song, produced by Del Shannon and featuring Max Crook on keyboards which went up to Number 3 on the U.S. Billboard Hot 100 and in Canada, and number 4 in South Africa. 

Hyland's version became a gold record. In that same year 1970, Major Lance also recorded the song.

Santana cover
Santana covered "Gypsy Woman" in 1990.  Their version is included on soundtrack of the movie Spirits Dancing in the Flesh.

Chart history

Weekly charts
The Impressions

Brian Hyland version

Santana cover

Year-end charts

References

External links
 AllMusic song review

The Impressions songs
Brian Hyland songs
Santana (band) songs
1961 songs
1961 singles
1970 singles
1990 singles
Songs written by Curtis Mayfield
ABC Records singles